Max Turner is a Scottish-German vocalist, producer and songwriter. He is known for being one of the core founders and contributors of the Puppetmastaz., as well as releasing a steady flow of collaborative and solo projects in his distinctive style of rhythm & poetry since his debut on Felix Kubin's Gagarin Records in 2001

Life and career

Career 
In 1999 Turner moved to Berlin and founded Puppetmastaz with his cousin Paul Affeld , Chilly Gonzales and several others. They were joined by Taylor Savvy to form the short lived rap-quartet The Bench which featured on a Tommy Boy Records release among others. The album Lost Treasures furthermore features early collaborations between the above-mentioned Mc's and producers such as Patric Catani, Bomb20 and Nitro, all of whom are considered the artistic bedrock of the Puppetmastaz crew. Other artists that Turner collaborated with and who influenced him during these formative professional years in Berlin include Peaches and Gina V. D'Orio of Cobrakiller as well as Jamie Lidell with whom he collaborated on  the Puppetmastaz single Scandalous.

Since leaving Berlin Turner has drifted between musical styles while sticking to his signature lyrics, living a semi-nomadic lifestyle and touring extensively with periods of up to a 100 shows per annum. Working with Producer Marcus Rossknecht he founded the band Meteorites in Barcelona where he lived for a significant period and signed to Cristian Vogel's Rise Robots Rise Records. His first solo album The purple pro, produced in Stockholm, gained some underground recognition that garnered further momentum through a string of collaborative releases with producers such as SchneiderTM for Cityslang, Cristian Vogel for Novamute and Matias Aguayo's De Papel for Kompakt records.  He has also contributed vocals to several releases by Japanese sound artist Kouhei Matsunaga on labels such as Important Records, Wordsound and Autechre's Skam label under the alternative moniker Google Premiere;. Another frequent collaborator and long time artistic ally is Canadian director and fellow lyricist Adam Traynor who was also a key figure in later years of the Puppetmastaz.

In 2009 Turner left Europe to train in Carnatic singing in India, exploring the subcontinent and founding a live project called The Migrations with several collaborators which contributed to the Boarder movement in Colombo, Sri Lanka, while also performing in metropolitan hubs of India. Turner has worked as an arranger, producer and songwriter for several seasons of runway shows by Vivienne Westwood  under the direction of Dominik Emrich.

Discography

Solo / group releases 
 Cuckoo clock – Max Turner 2018 (7" Vinyl, Fun in the church)
 Can you not hear the Music – The Migrations 2018 (7" Vinyl, Fun in the church)
 Keep yo Animal – Puppetmastaz 2017 (Double 12" Vinyl, CD,Verycords / Shitkatapult) 
 Transform the waves – Meteorites 2014 (CD, Groovescript records) 
 The Break Up – Puppetmastaz 2009 (CD, Vinyl 12", Discograph) 
 Early reflections – Max Turner 2008 (CD, Metabooty) 
 Mephistopheles – Puppetmastaz 2008 (12" Vinyl, CD, Discograph) 
 The Takeover – Puppetmastaz 2008 (12" Vinyl, CD / Double Vinyl – Discograph)
 Reservoir Foxxin / Scandalous – Puppetmastaz 2008 (12" Vinyl, Discograph)
 Infinite 4x4 – Max Turner 2008 (7" Vinyl, Metabooty) 
 Oranges – Max Turner 2008 (7" Vinyl, Metabooty) 
 Reflections on liquid – Max Turner 2008 (CD, Metabooty) 
 Clones – Live in Berlin – Puppetmastaz 2007 (12" Vinyl, Vicious Circle)
Carousel of Souls – 2006 Various Artists (12" Vinyl, Rostron Records)
Creature Shock Radio – Puppetmastaz 2006 (12" Vinyl, Vicious Circle / Louisville) 
 Bigger the better – Puppetmastaz 2005 (12" Vinyl, CD Louisville, Vicious Circle) 
 Do the swamp – Puppetmastaz 2005 (7" Vinyl, Def drive) 
 The purple pro – Max Turner 2005 (CD, Metabooty)
 Prosetti's Disco Balls – Puppetmastaz 2004 (12" Vinyl, PM01)
 Creature Funk – Puppetmastaz 2003 (CD, 12" Vinyl, Virgin Labels / EMI)
 Zoology – Puppetmastaz 2003 (CD, 12" Vinyl, Virgin Labels / EMI)
 Dub the mighty dragon – Meteorites 2003 (CD, 12" Vinyl, Rise robots rise) records)
 Milkman 7" – 2003 Meteorites (7" Vinyl, Rise robots rise records)
 Radianations on the Rise – 2003 Supercollider (12" Vinyl, Rise robots rise Records)
 Pet Sound – Puppetmastaz – 2002 (CD, 12" Vinyl, Virgin Labels / EMI)
 Humans get all the credit – Puppetmastaz 2001 (CD/ 12" Vinyl, Newnoise records) 
 Matchbox Jump & Jeepbeats – 2001 (12" Vinyl, Gagarin records)

Features / collaborations 
 Lost on Earth – Gebrüder Teichmann, 2018 (CD, 12" VinylNoland Recs.) 
 Yx yx aka 1ch aka solo – NHK, 2011 (Cd, Skam Records) 
 Self VA. – Kouhei Matsunaga, 2010 (Cd, Important Records) 
 Wear This World Out  – Night of the Brain, 2007 (Cd, 12" Vinyl, Station 55 records) 
 Škoda Mluvit –  SchneiderTM, 2006 (Cd, 12" Vinyl, Cityslang) 
 De Papel – Matias Aguayo, 2005 (Cd, 12" Vinyl Kompakt) 
 Station 55 – Cristian Vogel, 2005 (CD, 12" Vinyl, Novamute) 
 Voodoo Man Wear This World Out –  Electronicat 2005 (Cd 12" Vinyl, Disko B) 
 Big c What's the Sp – Cristian Vogel 2004 (12" Vinyl, Mosquito recs.) 
 Special Gunpowder –  DJ Rupture, 2004 (Cd, 12" Vinyl, Tigerbeat6) 
 Dem Nuh Know Me – DJ Rupture / Matt Shadetech, 2004 (12" Vinyl Shockout records) 
 Lost Treasures – Various artist, 2003 (Cd, Audio Chocolate) 
 Presidential suite –  Chilly Gonzales, 2002 (CD, 12"Vinyl, Kitty yo) 
 Zoomer – SchneiderTM, 2002 (CD, 12" Vinyl, Cityslang) 
 Sick – Sneaker Pimps 2002 (CD, 12" Vinyl, Tommy Boy Records) 
 The third armpit – Cobrakiller, 2002 (Cd, Valve records)

References

External links 
 
 Max Turner at Discogs

1980 births
Living people
Musicians from Hamburg